Max Lorentz (born in Täby, November 16, 1962) is a Swedish musician, songwriter and producer.
He has also worked as a session-musician with artists including Ulf Lundell, Sanne Salomonsen, Agnetha Fältskog, Björn Skifs, E-Type, Eldkvarn, Grymlings, Pugh Rogefeldt and Magnus Lindberg, and has hosted the Swedish TV shows Max, Live Show and Musikmatchen, and appearing in Jeopardy! on TV4. He hosted the radio show Sommartoppen in 1996.

He has released 6 solo albums to date. His 5th, released 8 June 2011, was a David Bowie covers collection entitled Kiss You in the Rain - Max Lorentz sings David Bowie on which he plays one song each from every Bowie album 1967 to 1980.

Other projects include a progressive instrumental album under the name Arktis, electro/dub project Dr. Livingstone with poet/director Anders Gullberg and 1970s hard rock band Mårran with whom he has released 4 albums in two years.

In 2017 he released his second David Bowie covers album. This time concentrating on Bowie songs from 1983 up to 2016. The record was called Shiningstar. 
2018 saw him starting a so called "instant composition" project called Rossi of Sweden. This resulted is the LP/album of the same name in November 2018.

He contributed 3 songs to the 2009 Crispin Glover Records album "All Sewn Up - A Tribute to Patrik Fitzgerald" together with Jello Biafra of the Dead Kennedys and Motorpsycho amongst others. 

In 2014 he became the 5th member of the legendary British rock group Tyla Gang and in 2015 a member of renowned Swedish progressive rock band Kaipa Da Capo with guitarist Roine Stolt.

Max Lorentz runs a record company called Blind Boyscout Recordings with mainly digital releases of his own as well as related music.

Production discography
Mikael Rickfors "Vingar" 1988
Tone Norum "Red" 1990
Mikael Rickfors "Judas River" 1991
Mats Ronander "Himlen Gråter För Elmore James" 1992
Lars Demian "Man Får Vara Glad Att Man Inte Är Död" 1994
Kim Larsen "Kim Larsen & Kjukken" 1996
Kim Larsen "Luft Under Vingerne" 1998
Rolf Wikström "Allting Förändras" 2001
Silverbug "Your Permanent Record" 2005
Dr. Livingstone "Au Tour De La Ville" 2006
Jonatan Stenson "Jonatan Stenson" 2007
Rolf Wikström "Istället för tystnad" 2011
Mårran "Mårran" 2012
Mårran "Mårran 2" 2012
Mårran "Vid liv" 2012
Mårran "Mårran 3/4" 2014
Tyla Gang "Live in Stockholm" 2014

Artist discography
Continental (with Bitch Boys) 1981
Subshow (with Subshow) 1986.
Lovely 1994
Bravo 1996
12 Songs 2000
The World Is Watching 2004
Au Tour De La Ville (with Dr.Livingstone) 2006
Arktis (progressive instrumental project) 2007
All Sewn Up - A Tribute to Patrik Fitzgerald 2009
Kiss You in the Rain - Max Lorentz sings David Bowie 2011
Shiningstar - Max Lorentz sings David Bowie again 2017
Rossi of Sweden (with Rossi of Sweden) 2018

Blind Boyscout Recordings

Releases up to date:
Arktis "Arktis (featuring Max Lorentz)" - Max Lorentz progressive instrumental recordings.
Subshow "Subshow" - The complete recordings of Max Lorentz and Michael Thimrén's 1980s grunge band.
Dr. Livingstone "Au Tour De La Ville" - Max Lorentz and Anders Gullberg's electro/dub project.
Johan Walin "Put Me In The Spotlight" - Max Lorentz' brother Johan Walin's debut LP from 1984.
Johan Walin "Live At Antons" - Max Lorentz' brother Johan Walin's second album from 1994.

Upcoming releases:
Bitch Boys "Continental" - The 1981 post-punk LP from Max Lorentz and Michael Thimrén's band.
Lovely - Max Lorentz 1994 debut album.
Bravo - Max Lorentz second album from 1996.
12 Songs - Max Lorentz third album from 2000.
The World Is Watching - Max Lorentz fourth album from 2004.

References

External links
 Official website: www.maxlorentz.com
 Interview with Max Lorentz:

1962 births
Living people
Swedish male musicians
People from Täby Municipality